The Frank Reed Three-Decker is a historic triple decker house in Worcester, Massachusetts.  It was built c. 1888 for Frank Reed, an electrician and machinist who eventually opened his own business.  The house is a particularly elegant example of a Queen Anne triple decker.  Its porch has square cut chamfered posts, is decorated with lattice work, and has a projecting gabled top.  The right side bay is round with a conical roof section, and is clad in shingles cut in a wavy pattern.  The deep cornice is decorated with brackets near the corners.

The house was listed on the National Register of Historic Places in 1990.

See also
Pilgrim Congregational Church (Worcester, Massachusetts), next door
National Register of Historic Places listings in southwestern Worcester, Massachusetts
National Register of Historic Places listings in Worcester County, Massachusetts

References

Apartment buildings in Worcester, Massachusetts
Apartment buildings on the National Register of Historic Places in Massachusetts
Queen Anne architecture in Massachusetts
Shingle Style architecture in Massachusetts
Houses completed in 1888
Triple-decker apartment houses
National Register of Historic Places in Worcester, Massachusetts